John Murumba Chikati (born 15 November 1962) is a Kenyan politician and the current Member of National Assembly for Tongaren Constituency, and the immediate former Special Secretary for Strategy and Delivery in the Office of the Deputy President. He is a member of The Forum for the Restoration of Democracy – Kenya (FORD-Kenya) a partner of the United Democratic Alliance party.

Early life and education 
Dr. Chikati is an Adjunct Faculty in the Project Management Department of the Commonwealth Open University.

1976-1977, schooled at Ortum Primary, from where he did Certificate, Certificate Of Primary Education (CPE).

In 1978, Dr. Chikati joined Teremi Secondary School, Bungoma, from where he did he attained a Kenya Ordinary Level Certificate (Form 4) in 1981.he later joined Mother Of Apostles Seminary for Form 5 and Form six, advanced level education, graduating in 1982 with a  Kenya Advanced Level Certificate ( Form 6).

Dr. Chikati joined the University of Nairobi in 1985 to study history , graduating in 1989 with a B.A. History. Later, 1990, he would join Commonwealth Open University for a masters degree in project management. He graduated with Master Of Science, Project Management degree in 1991. In 2010, Chikati enrolled for a post graduate program at the same university and graduated  with a Phd. Management in 2013.

Dr. Chikati also holds a diploma in  Personnel Management & Administration (1991) and a diploma in Modern Management & Administration (1992), all from Cambridge Tutorial College.

Professional background 
In 2015 Chikati was appointed by the president Uhuru Kenyatta as a Director at Nzoia Sugar Company where he served until 2017.

In 2018, he was appointed as the Special Secretary for Strategy and Delivery in the Office of the Deputy President William Samoei Ruto where he worked until March 2022.

Political career

Member of Parliament 
Chikati made his political debut in the 2002 General Election when he sought to vie for the Kimilili parliamentary seat,losing to the then minister for Trade and Industry Minister Mukhisa Kituyi. He returned again in 2007, this time vying on ODM party. However, as fate would have it, he lost to a new entrant  Eseli Simiyu. John Chikati vied for Tongaren Constituency parliamentary seat in the 2013 General elections on the United Democratic Forum (UDF) party ticket where he emerged second.

Chikati joined the Jubilee party in the 2017 General elections where he lost to the former FORD-Kenya Secretary General Eseli Simiyu while vying for Member of National Assembly for Tongaren Constituency.

In 2022, while vying on a FORD-Kenya party ticket, Chikati won in the 2022 General elections as the Member of National Assembly for Tongaren Constituency with over 20,000 votes.

Honors and awards 

 M.B.S (Moran of the Order of the Burning Spear) Medal By President

References 

www.johnchikati.com

21st-century Kenyan politicians
1962 births
Living people
Members of the 13th Parliament of Kenya
Forum for the Restoration of Democracy – Kenya politicians